The 2001 Sparkassen Cup singles was the tennis singles event of the twelfth edition of the Sparkassen Cup; a WTA Tier II tournament held in Leipzig, Germany.

Kim Clijsters successfully defended her title, defeating Magdalena Maleeva in the final, 6–1, 6–1.

Seeds
The top four seeds received a bye to the second round.

Draw

Finals

Top half

Bottom half

External links
 2001 Sparkassen Cup Draw

Singles 2001
2001 WTA Tour